Nina Bogićević (Serbian Cyrillic: Нина Богићевић; born January 10, 1989) is a Serbian women's basketball player. She recently played for CTL Zagłębie Sosnowiec from Poland ending  the season as a second scorer of the league with average 17.80 points per game and as the best shooter for 3 points of the league with 44,2% .

External links
Profile at eurobasket.com

1989 births
Living people
Basketball players from Belgrade
Serbian expatriate basketball people in Hungary
Serbian expatriate basketball people in Spain
Serbian expatriate basketball people in France
Serbian expatriate basketball people in Turkey
Serbian women's basketball players
Shooting guards
ŽKK Crvena zvezda players

Mediterranean Games silver medalists for Serbia
Competitors at the 2009 Mediterranean Games
Mediterranean Games medalists in basketball